Asteridea may refer to:

 Sea star
 Asteridea (plant), a genus of plants in the family Asteraceae